Amongst the Madness is the debut album by the British rap duo the Nextmen. It was released by 75 Ark in 2000. The track "Amongst the Madness" was featured on the Tony Hawk's Pro Skater 3 soundtrack.

Track listing
"Amongst the Madness" - 3:57
"Break the Mould" - 4:43
"File Under Truth" - 3:44
"We Originate" - 2:41
"Step Below the Surface" - 4:00
"My Way" - 3:51
"Thinking Man's Session" - 4:58
"We Got" - 4:35
"Buck Foolish" - 4:27
"Clarity" - 6:11
"Shine On" - 4:46
"Sex, Lies, and Videotape" - 3:39
"Mental Alchemy" - 4:13
"Turn It Up a Little" - 3:23
"EBS" - 5:36
"Revitalise" - 5:00
"Simple and Plain" - 3:57 (CD only bonus track)

References

The Nextmen albums
2000 debut albums
75 Ark albums